is a Japanese actress, tarento, model, and singer.

Biography
Mizusawa was born in Meguro, Tokyo and graduated from the Japan Women's College of Physical Education (Dance Major) in 1977.

She made her acting debut in October 1972 in the TBS Television drama Natsu ni Kita Musume, based on Keita Genji's novel Aozora Musume. Meanwhile, she dropped out from Yamawaki Gakuen High School because they were banning performing arts activities and transferred to Nikaido High School.

On 1 July 1973, she made her debut as a singer at CBS Sony Records (now Sony Music Entertainment (SMEJ)) with Musume-gokoro with the catchphrase "Three women of the Sony family". In 1973, she adopted her current stage name "Aki Mizusawa".

She made regular appearances in NHK's popular quiz show Rensō Game since 1975.

She worked as a model including swimwear and other assignments including adult magazines.  She has had a number of film and television series roles.

Private life

In 1986, she married American businessman and voice actor Guy Cihi. They had a son and daughter, but divorced in 1993.

Her son, Julian, debuted as an actor in 2011. Her daughter, Frances Cihi, is a tarento, painter and English conversation teacher who appeared on the reality television series Terrace House: Boys × Girls Next Door.

Appearances

TV dramas
Natsu ni Kita Musume (1972, TBS)
Manmaru Shikaku (1973, TBS)
Ikite Aishite (1973, NHK)
Tenka Dōdō (1973, NHK)
Dokkoi Daisaku (1973, NET) – as Kyoko Narumi
Episode 47 "Seishun no hitotsu" (1973)
Episode 58 "Jō Muyō no Nihonichi" (1974)
Onmitsu Kenshi: Tsuppashire! Episode 2 "Soratobu Shintarō" (1974, TBS) – as Mitsuyo
Jikengari Episode 8 (1974, TBS)
Brother Gekijō
Wakai Sensei (1974) – as Keiko Katsuki
Soreike! Katchin Episode 7 "Sensei no Otoshidama" (1976)
Playgirl Q Episode 17 "Onna wa Hadaka de Tsuyokunaru" (1975, 12ch/Toei)
Furimuku na Tsurukichi Episode 22 (1975, NHK)
Toshiba Nichiyō Gekijō (TBS)
945th "Ashita mata" (1975) Sugako Hashida/Screenplay
970th "Ai tte nā ni" (1975) Sugako Hashida/Screenplay
983rd "Daremo Shiranai Ai" (1975) Sugako Hashida/Screenplay
Chin Dondon (1975, NTV)
Tōyama no Kin-san 1st Series (1975, NET/Toei)
Moeru Sōsamō Episode 3 (1975, NET/Toei)
Jitte Muyō: Kuchō Hori Koto-ken Jō Episode 7 "Nusutto Jingi" (1975, NTV/Toei)
Dai Tokai Tatakai no Hibi Episode 1 "Imōto" (1976, NTV/Ishihara Promotion) – as Motoko Nakagawa
Machāki no Mori no Hikage no Kazura Episodes 25–26 (1976, NET)
Taiyō ni Hoero! (Toho/NTV)
Episode 185 "Niji" (1976) – Kayo Mizushima
Episode 462 "Anata ni Sono-goe ga Kikoeru ka" (1981) – Haruko Asou
Episode 466 "Hitori botchi no Shi" (1981) – same as above
Episode 497 "Gori-san ga Kenjū o Utenaku natta!" (1982) – same as above
Episode 512 "Fiance no Shi" (1982) – same as above
Episode 523 "Gori-san, Shi no Taiketsu" (1982) – same as above
Episode 525 "Ishizuka Keiji Junshoku" (1982) – same as above
Episode 665 "Junshokukeiji-tachi yo, ya sura kani" (1985) – same as above
Ōedo Sōsamō Episode 228 "Manbiki Hime Dai Funsen" (1976, 12ch/Mifune Pro) – as Ayahime
Agari Itchō! (1976, NTV)
Kazue wa Kazue (1976, NHK)
Kāsan Dōdō (1977, TBS) – Junko Mizuki
Mito Kōmon (TBS/)
Part 8 Episode 1 "Satsuma e Mukau Yonaoshi Tabi-Edo" (1977) – as Ojun
Part 10 Episode 10 "Mukoiri Hatchō Miso-Okazaki" (1979) – as Oyoshi
Part 14 Episode 8 "Ninjō Benibana Fūfu Some-Yonezawa" (1984) – as Oen
Suna no Utsuwa (1977, CX) – as Hanae*Re-edited broadcast in 1985
Saturday Night at the Mysteries (EX)
Saigo no Kake/Rō Keiji to Kinko-yaburi (1977, Daiei/Haiyuza Movie Broadcasting Department)
Kyōhaku Kōfuku o Kaimasen ka (1978, EX/Toho)
Kimagure Honkakuha (1977–78, NTV)
Honō no Ie Ai wa Ni-do Umareru (1978, KTV)
Daruma Taisuke Jikenchō Episode 21 "Kaette Kita Kōfuku" (1978, EX/Zenshinza/KHK) – as Oshin
Kurenai Kujaku (1978, NHK) voice appearance
National Golden Gekijō (EX)
Teki ka? Mikata ka 3 Tai 3 (1978)
Dareka-san to Dareka-san (1978)
Kieta Giants (1978, NTV) – as Fumiko
Fūrintori Monochō (1978, EX/Toei)
Shinshun Suiri Series (2) "Neko ga Hakonda Shinbun" (1979, EX)
Netsuai Ikka Love (1979, TBS)
Majo Densetsu (1979, CX)
Onna-tachi no Ie (1980, CX) Yumie Hiraiwa/Screenplay
The Shōsha (1980, NHK) – as Kaoru
Hashire! Nekketsu Keiji (1981, EX)
Netchū Jidai 2nd Series Episode 34 "Netchū-sensei to Nagai Sakubun" (1981, NTV) – as Noriko Asakura
Kakurenbo (1981, NTV)
Ginga TV Shōsetsu Fukkatsu (1981, NHK)
Saturday Night at the Mysteries Tōrima Renzoku Satsujin Osowa reta Danchi Tsuma (1981, EX)
Saturday Night at the Mysteries Maboroshi no Onna Rikon Satsujin no Wana (1981, EX)
Saturday Night at the Mysteries Kyōsaku Suiri Series 1 Ryōri Kyōshitsu Satsujin Jiken Tamago no Trick (1981, EX)
Ame agari no Onna (1982, EX)
Matsudaira Ukon Jiken-chō (1982, NTV) – as Osayo
Kayō Suspense Gekijō Kōkō Yakyū Satsujin Jiken (1982, NTV)
Bigō o Shitte imasu ka (1982, NHK) – 11th International Emmy Award Excellence Award Winning Work in United States
Kimi wa Umi o Mitaka (1982, CX)
Saturday Night at the Mysteries Seicho Matsumoto no Kiken na Shamen Hakkotsu ni natta Onna (1982, EX) – as Ryoko Noseki
Saturday Night at the Mysteries Imōto o Okashita Otoko Naki Ryū no Nazo o Motomete (1982, EX)
Doyō Drama Tsuiseki Episode 3 (5 Feb 1983, NHK)
Ōoku (1983, KTV)
Episode 12 "Mizaru Iwazaru Kikazaru" – as Oriki
Episode 35 "Un no Warui Onna-tachi", Episode 36 "Mikkai" – as Takehime
Getsuyō Wide Gekijō Uchi Yome Sensō Ganko oyaji VS Bjin Shimai Rengō-gun! (1983, EX)
Saturday Night at the Mysteries Danchi Tsuma no sakebi Kekkon Go-nen-me no Hakyoku! (1983, EX)
Toshiba Nichiyō Gekijō 1438th "29-Sai" (1984, TBS)
Yūzora harete (1984, CBC)
Ōoka Echizen: Dai 8-bu Episode 26 "Shōgun Sukutta Bijo Gundan" (21 Jan 1985, TBS/C.A.L) – as Misa
Kayō Suspense Gekijō Kyoto Bojō Satsujin Jiken (1985, NTV)
Toshiba Nichiyō Gekijō 1473rd "Roji kara no Kefuhakujiyau" (1985, RKB
Saturday Night at the Mysteries Office Tsuma no sakebi Chōkōsōbiru kara Shi no Tōshin!? (1985, EX)
Mokuyō Golden Drama Anata wa Tsuma o Sukueru ka (1985, YTV)
Mokuyō Golden Drama Anata ni Nita Ko (1985, YTV)
Asobi janai no yo, kono Koi wa (1986, TBS)
Saturday Night at the Mysteries Hakui no Fukugō Satsujin (1987, EX)
Onsen Nakai Monogatari (7) "Dōkeshima meguri Ai-Nami no Se ni Otome no Uta ga Chiru" (1987, TX)
Sanbon Ashi no Mei Mōdōken Serve Ai no Monogatari (1989, EX)
Misa Yamamura Suspense Kyoto Higashiyama Satsujin Jiken (1990, EX) – as Ryoko Morimiya
Kao Ai no Gekijō Issho ni Kurashitai (1990, TBS)
Sasurai Keiji Ryojō-hen III Episode 12 (1990, EX)
TV Ehon Crayon Ōkoku (1990, 1993, NHK E) – Recitation
Haha (1990, TX)
Dramatic 22 "Gokugoku Heibon na Katei no 'Kōfukuna Sei'" (1990, TBS)
Kayō Mystery Gekijō Kangofu-chō Suiri Karute Onsen Byōin Kaiki Renzoku Satsujin Jiken (1991, EX)
Saturday Night at the Mysteries Kaseifu wa Mita! 10 (1992, EX)
Muttsu no Rikon Suspense Hoken Shōsho ga Sasayaku (1992, KTV)
Depart! Aki Monogatari Episode 8 (1992, TBS) – as Mrs. Yuki
Junichi Yaoi no I Jigen World (2) "Taiji no Kioku" (1993, NTV)
Doyō Drama Hōsō Kisha Monogatari (1995, NHK)
Doshirōto Keiji Satsujin Jiken-bo (1996, TBS) – as Aya Akiyama
Saturday Night at the Mysteries Kochira Zendera Tantei-kyoku: Kimyōna Senjafuda Renzoku Satsujin Jiken! (1996, EX)
Kinyō Jidaigeki Yume-reki Nagasaki Bugyō Episode 8 (24 May 1996, NHK)
Kindaichi Shōnen no Jikenbo 2nd Series Episodes 2–3/File 11 "Tarot Sansō Satsujin Jiken" (1996, NTV)
Getsuyō Drama Special Doshirōto Keiji Satsujin Jiken-bo (1996, TBS)
Weekend Drama Shiyou yo (1996, EX)
Kinyō Entertainment Kyoto Yoru no Gion Satsujin Jiken (1997, CX)
Drama Shinginga Konya mo Gochisōsama (1997, NHK)
Uchi e Oideyo (1997, KTV)
Seija no Kōshin (1998, TBS)
Don Wallie! (1998, KTV)
Konya mo Gochisōsama Sōshūhen (1998, NHK)
Sawayaka Superwoman (1998, TBS)
Kayō Suspense Gekijō Keibuho Jiro Tsukuda 6 (1998, NTV)
Gekai Sanshiro Natsume (1998, EX) – as Makiko Tange
Drama Ai no Shi Kora! Nanba shiyo tto (29 Dec 1998, NHK)
Ultraman Gaia (1998–99, Tsuburaya Productions/MBS) – as Shigemi Takayama
Asadora Yancha kure (1998–99, NHK)
Kayō Suspense Gekijō Tsuiseki 5 (1999, NTV)
Nagoya Senkyakubanrai (2000, NHK)
Kayō Suspense Gekijō Keibuho Jiro Tsukuda 11 (2000, NTV)
Drama 30 Konbi ni Maria (2001, CBC)
Yankee Bokō ni Kaeru (2003, TBS)
Kiken na Kankei (2005, THK)
Rocket Boys (2006, TX)
Saturday Night at the Mysteries Otori Sōsakan Shiho Kitami 10 (2006, EX)
Suiyō Mystery 9 Yasuo Uchida Suspense: Shinano no Colombo 13: Mōmoku no Pianist (2006, BS Japan, TX)
Taiga drama Fūrin Kazan Episode 2 (2007, NHK) – as Ōbayashi Kanzaemon (Takashi Sasano)'s wife, Kikuyo
Friday Night Drama Tokumei Kakarichō Hitoshi Tadano (3rd Season) Episode 29 (2007, EX)
Okawari`Hanzō (2007, TX)
Joshideka! Episode 6 (22 Nov 2007, TBS) – as Mutsuko Tokita
Kinyō Prestiege Tsugarukaikyō Mystery Kōro (7) (29 Feb 2008, CX) – as Noriko Nakamichi
Jiro Akagawa Mystery 4 Shimai Tantei-dan Episode 8 (7 Mar 2008, ABC, EX) – as Shizue Yamane
Tomorrow –Yō wa mata noboru– Episode 9 (31 Aug 2008, TBS) – as Masae Sendo
Jin Episodes 4, 5, Final Episode (1, 8 Nov, 20 Dec 2009, TBS) – as Landlady
Kinyō Prestiege Misa Yamamura Suspense Kuro no Kassōro –Kinji rareta Ichizoku– (13 Jan 2012, CX) – as Yuri Chintao
Saturday Night at the Mysteries Kyotaro Nishimura Suspense Tetsudō Sōsa-kan 15 (4 Apr 2015, EX) – as Kazumi Kusunoki
Suiyō Mystery 9 Hoken Hanzai Chōsa-in Hatsune Saeki Kūhaku no Kiten (20 Jul 2016, TX) – as Yoshiko Yamane
Seicho Matsumoto Botsugo 25-nen Tokubetsu Kikaku Gosa (2017, TX) – as Saori Kawada

Films
Shinjuku Baka Monogatari (1977) – as Noriko
Dō ni Demo shite (1978)
Tsuide no Mai (1984) – as Shima Shimamura
Barrow Gang BC (1985) – as Nishino-sensei
Star (1986) – as Sugissho
Zukkoke Sanningumi Kaitō X Monogatari (Toei) (1998) – as Miyoko Yamanaka
Yoshimoto Director's 100 Pakyura! (short film, 2007)
San Jū Kyū-mai no Nengajō (2008)
Yasashī Te (2011) – as Aoi

Stage
Marius (1983)
Aru Onna
Mitsukoshi Summer Vacation Family Theater/Musical Cinderella (25 Jul – 2 Aug 2009, Mitsukoshi Theater, etc.) – as Witch
Ai ga Korose to sasayaita (16–25 Sep 2011, Sogetsu Hall) – starring; as Aiko Tsuruta

Anime films
Hashire Melos! (1992) – Queen Fulune

Dubbing
Agatha Christie's Poirot "The Dream" – as Joanna Farley
Chaplin

Radio
Say! Young (1974–76, NCB)
Aki Mizusawa no Fashionable World (1979–81, Tokyo FM)
Energy Salon
Shinosuke Radio Rakugo De Date (15 Nov 2009, NCB)

Advertisements
Utena Keshōhin
Kanebō Keito "Alps Keito," "Summer Bell," "Shan Bell"
Nippon Denchi "GS Battery" (1979–80)
Suntory "Haig" (British whisky) 1982 calendar (1981)
Toyotomi Kōgyō "Toyo Stove" (1982–84)
Ken Bix (2002)
Cipher "Kanpō View"
Dr. Ci:Labo "Ano Hito ga Akasu Biyō-hō"

Television (others)
Wide Kodomo Show Bunbun Banban (1973–75, NET)
Uta wa Tomodachi (1974, NHK)
Variety Sekai Fumito Manyū (1975, NHK)
Morning Jumbo Okusama 8-jihandesu (TBS)
Quiz! Kazoku Doremifa Taishō (1976, CX) – Moderator with Takeaki Kashimura
9th Japan Music Awards (1978, EX) – Moderator with Tadao Takashima
Rensō Game (1978–79, NHK) – Red Team captain
The Request Show (1979–80, EX) – Moderator with Monta Mino
Olympuson '80 (May 1980, EX) – Moscow Report
Quiz Omoshiro Seminar (1981–86, NHK)
Camera Gihō Nyūmon (1981–82, NHK E)
Kinyō Omoshiro Variety Meitō! Hitō! Nihon no Onsen Best 101 (17 Oct 1986, CX) – Moderator
Naruhodo! The World (CX) – Overseas reporter
Game Sūji de Q (1991–92, NHK)
Sukusuku Akachan (1992–93, NHK E)
Quiz Nihonjin no Shitsumon (1994–98, NHK)
Genki Kazoku (1998–2000, KTV)
Shin Quiz Nihonjin no Shitsumon (2000–01, NHK)
Aki Mizusawa-Manten Yume Shop (KTV)
Ryōhin Kōbō TeleShop

Television advertisements
Hisamitsu Pharmaceutical "New Salon Pass"
Nomura Securities (1975)
Shinkin bank
Yoshihara Seiyu "Golden Salad-yu" (1977)
Nisshin Seifun Group Cheesecake Mix "Koolon,"  "Ma Ma Spaghetti"
Brother Industries "Brother Amiki," "Brother Mishin"
Yamaha Motor Company Soft bike "Pasola," Small "Dinghy" (1977–80)
Unilever Japan "Sunsilk Shampoo"
Coca-Cola Japan "Nasuta Potato Chips"
Imuraya Confectionery
Kao Corporation "Kantan My Pet," "Bus Magic Lin"

Bibliography

Photo albums
"Aki Mizusawa no Jōnetsu" Gekisha Bunko (20 Mar 1986, Shogakukan, Shooting: Kishin Shinoyama) 
Aki Mizusawa–Photography Kishin Shinoyama 1975-1995 (1 May 1995, Shogakukan, Shooting: Kishin Shinoyama)

Omnibus photo albums
Gekisha-135-Ri no Onna tomodachi (15 May 1979, Shogakukan, Shooting: Kishin Shinoyama)
Masaharu Makino Joyū Kokorozashi Jō (15 Jun 1979, Kusakaze-sha)
20 Seiki no Venus 1966-2000 (Dec 2000, Shueisha) 
Towa Hozon-ban Shashin-shū Heibon Punch –Yomigaere, Idol no Jidai– (24 Apr 2008, Magazine House)

Internet photo albums
Internet Kishin Shinoyama S Book Aki Mizusawa 1., 2., and 3. (Shogakukan, 50 pages each)

Books and related works
Camera Gihō Nyūmon (1981, Japan Broadcasting Publishing Association) Text of the programme with the same name
Yume mitai ni Eigo Perapera (1986, Kadokawa Shoten) 
Piano de Pops o III (1991, Japan Broadcasting Publishing Association) Text of the programme with the same name
Aki Mizusawa no Kosodate Rikon Wars (by Hiroshi Kosuga/1995, Schola) 
Aki Mizusawa no Bust Up Senka (edited by Health information network/1995, Dai Seiko) 
Aki, Julian, Frances no Homemade Eikaiwa (1999, The Masada) 
Mare ni Miru Bakajo (Bessatsu Takarajima Real 043) (2003, Takarajimasha) 
"Zutsū kurai" de Byōin e Ikō (by Toshihiko Shimizu/2005, MNS-Kawade Shobo Shinsha Publishers inc.) 
Aki Mizusawa "Atatame Haramaki Diet" (by Yosuke Hisanaga/2010, Kodansha)

Discography

Albums
Musume-gokoro (21 Sep 1973) (CBS Sony/SOLJ-84)-Same CD (SRCL-2892)-(Audition and download sales by mora)
Musume-gokoro
Lyrics: Michio Yamagami/Composition: Kyōhei Tsutsumi/Arrangement: Kyōhei Tsutsumi
Oshibana Nikki
Lyrics: Michio Yamagami/Composition: Kyōhei Tsutsumi/Arrangement: Kyōhei Tsutsumi
Anata no Koto de Ippai
Lyrics: Michio Yamagami/Composition: Kyōhei Tsutsumi/Arrangement: Hiroshi Takada
Yubikiri
Lyrics: Michio Yamagami/Composition: Kyōhei Tsutsumi/Arrangement: Kyōhei Tsutsumi
No no komichi
Lyrics: Michio Yamagami/Composition: Kyōhei Tsutsumi/Arrangement: Kyōhei Tsutsumi
Itsumo no Eki made
Lyrics: Michio Yamagami/Composition: Kyōhei Tsutsumi/Arrangement: Kyōhei Tsutsumi
Ai o Shittakara
Lyrics: Rei Nakanashi/Composition: Kyōhei Tsutsumi/Arrangement: Hiroshi Takada
Dare mo Shiranai
Lyrics: Tokiko Iwatani/Composition: Kyōhei Tsutsumi/Arrangement: Hiroshi Takada
Kawa o Nogiku ga
Lyrics: Jun Hashimoto/Composition: Kyōhei Tsutsumi/Arrangement: Hiroshi Takada
Itsu Kara ka
Lyrics: Tokiko Iwatani/Composition: Kyōhei Tsutsumi/Arrangement: Hiroshi Takada
Sayonara nante Iwanaide
Lyrics: Jun Hashimoto/Composition: Kyōhei Tsutsumi/Arrangement: Kyōhei Tsutsumi
Watashi wa Wasurenai
Lyrics: Jun Hashimoto/Composition: Kyōhei Tsutsumi/Arrangement: Kyōhei Tsutsumi
Musume-gokoro+7–All Songs Collection (29 Sep 2015) (Sony Music Custom Made Factory/DQCL-581)-(Direct sale limited CD)
All songs from the album Musume-gokoro and released songs not included in the album are included

Singles
Musume-gokoro/Itsumo no Eki made (1 Jul 1973) (CBS Sony, the same above/SOLB-41)
Lyrics: Michio Yamagami/Composition-Arrangement: Kyōhei Tsutsumi
Himitsu/Futari no Yuki (1 Nov 1973) (SOLB-84)
Lyrics: Michio Yamagami/Composition-Arrangement: Kyōhei Tsutsumi
Atsui dekigoto/Anata no Koto de Ippai (21 Mar 1974) (SOLB-120)
Lyrics: Kazumi Yasui/Composition-Arrangement: Kyōhei Tsutsumi
Anata no Koto de Ippai; Lyrics: Michio Yamagami/Composition: Kyōhei Tsutsumi/Arrangement: Hiroshi Takada
Inori/Onomichi no Ame (21 Sep 1974) (SOLB-177)
Lyrics: Takashi Matsumoto/Composition-Arrangement: Takashi Miki
Meguri Awase/Konya wa Kaette (21 Mar 1975) (SOLB-228)
Lyrics: Rei Nakanashi/Composition-Arrangement: Takashi Miki

Compilations
Early 70's Female Idol Collection Vol.1 (SRCL- 4230)
"Musume-gokoro" recording

References

External links
 – Oscar Promotion 
 – Official Blog & SNS by beamie 
 –Oscar Electronic Catalog 
Yūkan Fuji: Zakzak – Interview "Hitori-goto" (21 May 2005) 
Tokyo Shimbun Hot Web – Yōkoso! My Hometown "Akasaka ga Watashi no Hometown" (November 2014) 

Japanese voice actresses
Japanese female models
Japanese idols
Actresses from Tokyo
1954 births
Living people